Box the Pony is a 1997 play co-written by Australian actress Leah Purcell and Scott Rankin. It is a semi-autobiographical one-woman show, set in an Aboriginal community in Queensland. It has played at Sydney's Belvoir Street Theatre, the Sydney Opera House, the 1999 Edinburgh Festival and in 2000 at the Barbican in London.

Awards
 2000 - Queensland Premier's Literary Awards Drama Script (Stage) Award, accepted by Leah Purcell and Scott Rankin

Notes

References
 Literary Awards - Past winners Queensland Government (retrieved 11-August-2007)

1997 plays
Australian plays
Indigenous Australian theatre
Plays set in Australia